The following lists events that happened during 2000 in Norway.

Incumbents
 Monarch – Harald V
 Prime Minister – Kjell Magne Bondevik (Christian Democratic Party) until 17 March, Jens Stoltenberg (Labour Party)

Events

January
 19 January – Five people die when a bus is taken by an avalanche in Lyngen.

March
 11 March – Three people die when a community center in Målselv collapse due to heavy snowfall.
 17 March – Stoltenberg's First Cabinet was appointed.

April
 5 April – Two freight trains collide at Lillestrøm Station. 2,000 people were evacuated because of the danger of a gas explosion.

May
 19 May – Baneheia murders

June
 23 June – The Frøya Tunnel is opened.
 June – Project Deep Spill: the first intentional deepwater oil and gas spill, which was done in order to study how crude oil behaved at depth.

December
 1 December – King Harald V of Norway informs the Norwegian government about the engagement between Crown Prince Haakon and Mette-Marit Tjessem Høiby.
 4 December – The state-owned telecommunications company Telenor is partially privatised and listed on the Oslo Stock Exchange and NASDAQ.

Popular culture

Sports
19 to 26 February – The Biathlon World Championships 2000 were held in Holmenkollen.

Music 

 Norway in the Eurovision Song Contest 2000

Film

Literature

Births 
 

10 January – Erik Botheim, footballer
6 February – Jørgen Strand Larsen, footballer
18 February – Anders Waagan, footballer
27 February – Erik Sandberg, footballer
29 February – Hugo Vetlesen, footballer
7 April – André Klippenberg Grindheim, swimmer.
7 May – Markus Karlsbakk, footballer
21 July 
Erling Haaland, English-born Norwegian footballer
Jens Lurås Oftebro, Nordic combined skier
19 September – Jakob Ingebrigtsen, middle- and long-distance runner.

Notable deaths

9 January – Olaug Hay, politician (b.1902)
11 January – Edvard Magnus Edvardsen, politician (b.1910).
21 January – Kristian Asdahl, politician (b.1920)
27 January – Asle Enger, priest (born 1906).
3 February – Aslaug Fredriksen, politician (b.1918)
16 February – Karsten Solheim, golf club designer and businessman in America (b.1911)
2 March – Audun Boysen, middle-distance runner and Olympic bronze medallist (b.1928)
3 March – Egil Werner Erichsen, politician (b.1901)
6 March – Ole Jacob Hansen, jazz drummer (b.1940).
18 March – Randi Hultin, jazz critic and impresario (b.1926).
2 April – Greta Gynt, singer, dancer and actress (b.1916)
2 April – Synnøve Anker Aurdal, textile artist (born 1908).
11 April – Olav Økern, cross country skier and Olympic bronze medallist (b.1911)
22 April – Arnt Eliassen, meteorologist (b.1915)
28 April – Anders Skauge, politician (b.1912)
19 May – Petter Hugsted, ski jumper and Olympic gold medallist (b.1921)
11 June – Aud Alvær, politician (b.1921)
22 June – Svein Finnerud, jazz pianist (b.1945).
26 June – Arne Thomas Olsen, actor, stage producer and theatre director (b.1909)
27 June – Dagmar Maalstad, politician (b.1902)
2 September – Johannes Sandven, educator (born 1909).
17 October – Joachim «Jokke» Nielsen (36), rock musician and poet.
10 September – Haldis Havrøy, politician (b.1925)
4 November – Anneliese Dørum, politician (b.1939)
18 November – Torstein Tynning, politician (b.1932)
28 November – Margith Johanne Munkebye, politician (b.1911)

Full date unknown
Bjarte Birkeland, literary researcher (b.1920)
Finn-Egil Eckblad, mycologist and professor (b.1923)
Jostein Goksøyr, microbiologist (b.1922)
Kjell Holler, politician and Minister (b.1925)
Jul Låg, soil researcher (b.1915)
Arne B. Mollén, sports official (b.1913)
Odd Narud, businessperson (b.1919)
Christian Norberg-Schulz, architect, architectural historian and theorist (b.1926)

See also

References

External links